Brooke Kinsella  (born 17 July 1983) is a British actress, author and anti-knife crime campaigner. A graduate of the Anna Scher Theatre School, Kinsella has been acting since childhood. She has had various roles on television and in film. Her most notable role is that of Kelly Taylor, who featured in BBC's long-running soap opera, EastEnders, between 2001 and 2004. She has her own drama school called True Stars Academy.

Kinsella's family made headlines in the British press in 2008 following the murder of her half-brother, Ben, who was stabbed to death in June 2008. After his death, hundreds of people protested along with Kinsella over knife fatalities in London.

Career
Kinsella attended the Maria Fidelis RC Convent School in Camden. Prompted by her mother, who wanted to encourage her to take up a hobby she enjoyed, Kinsella attended the Anna Scher Theatre School at the age of 6, and stayed there until she was 16.

She made her television debut at the age of 7 in the BBC children's series Mud and has appeared in a variety of other TV productions, including Coming Home. As well as appearing in an episode of the BBC series Sunburn in 2000, she has also appeared in the entirely unrelated music video "Sunburn" by British rock band, Muse.

Film credits include the Channel 4 film Kid In The Corner (1999), about a child with ADHD, and the controversial ITV film No Child of Mine (1997), in which she played a young girl subjected to systematic sexual abuse.

In 2002, Kinsella appeared as Liz Chambers in ITV1's cop show The Bill, playing a teenage runaway. Her character is later the first victim of the original Sun Hill Serial Killer.

Her stage credits include School Play at Soho Theatre (2001) and a rehearsed reading of Skyvers by Barry Reckord at the Royal Court Theatre in 2006.

Before securing the role of Kelly Taylor in EastEnders, Kinsella had  auditioned for the parts of Zoe Slater, Janine Butcher and Sonia Jackson, but was unsuccessful. Kinsella completed the first year of a degree in English, Media and Drama at Buckinghamshire New University before joining the cast of EastEnders. She joined the show for a brief stint in 2001, before returning as a full-time cast member from 2002 to 2004. During her time on the soap opera, Brooke's character weathered prostitution, relationship break-ups and confusion over her sexual identity prompted by a lesbian kiss with Michelle Ryan's character, Zoe Slater. The kiss was criticised in the British media as cheap sensationalism and branded as a ratings-stunt. Louise Berridge, the one-time executive producer of EastEnders, made the decision to axe Kinsella's character in 2004 to allow further character development of her on-screen best friend, Zoe Slater; however, Kinsella maintains it was a mutual decision between herself and Berridge. In March 2008, Brooke said in an interview with Woman magazine that she would love to return to EastEnders at some point. In 2018, she helped the writers of EastEnders with a stabbing storyline involving the characters, Shakil Kazemi and Keegan Taylor.

Kinsella and her real-life partner Ray Panthaki (who played Ronny Ferreira in EastEnders) played a heroin-taking couple in director Andrew Jones's film The Feral Generation, which was shot during the period of December 2006 and January 2007 and premiered at the 2007 Portobello Film Festival. Her debut novel, Friendship Is A Funny Thing is awaiting publication. She was made an MBE for her work on knife crime in the Queen's Birthday Honours 2011.

Personal life
Kinsella's father left the family when she was four years old and she was subsequently raised by her mother Debbie and stepfather George, who Kinsella has described as her "real dad". She lives in Islington, north London and is the oldest of four children; she has two sisters, Jade and Georgia, and a half brother, Ben.

Kinsella married her long-term partner Simon Boardley on 28 December 2017. On 22 September 2020, Kinsella gave birth to their first child, a daughter, Elsie Rose Georgia Boardley. On 29 June 2022, Kinsella gave birth to their second child, a boy, Ben Ross Boardley, named after her brother.

Murder of brother

On 29 June 2008 at 02:00 BST, Kinsella's 16-year-old brother, Ben Kinsella was stabbed to death by a gang of three youths in a London street. Ben, the seventeenth teenager killed in London in 2008, died in hospital a few hours later. Kinsella said she was "devastated".

Following his death, Kinsella and her family led hundreds of people in a march to protest against London's knife and gun crime. On 3 July 2008, three people were charged with Ben's murder, for which they were later tried and convicted. The Kinsella family launched the Ben Kinsella Trust in Ben's memory, in a bid to end knife crime. In the run up to the 2010 general election, Kinsella announced her support for the Conservative Party and revealed she would head a panel deciding how grants were distributed to voluntary groups tackling youth crime.

On 23 and 25 February 2011, an anti-knife campaign, funded by the Kinsella trust was run in Birmingham's New Street Station, in conjunction with the British Transport Police and Great Barr School's drama department from its Sixth Form centre. A play was performed to the public throughout each of these days in the station's concourse, to raise awareness of the effects of knife crime.

Kinsella was appointed Member of the Order of the British Empire (MBE) in the 2011 Birthday Honours for services to the prevention of knife crime.

In December 2018, Kinsella appeared in an episode of the BBC One series Defenders UK to talk about the murder of her brother, Ben.

Filmography

Films

Television

References

External links

www.benkinsella.org.uk

1983 births
Living people
Actresses from London
Alumni of the Anna Scher Theatre School
English activists
English women activists
English people of Irish descent
English soap opera actresses
English stage actresses
English television actresses
Members of the Order of the British Empire
People from Islington (district)